Ill Gotten Gains is a 1997 film starring Djimon Hounsou.

Plot
Africans revolt while imprisoned aboard a slave ship.

See also
 List of films featuring slavery

References

External links

1997 films
Films about slavery
1997 independent films
1990s political films